Vilhelm Lehmusvirta (20 November 1889 – 17 April 1952) was a Finnish wrestler. He competed in the featherweight event at the 1912 Summer Olympics.

References

External links
 

1889 births
1952 deaths
Sportspeople from Tampere
People from Häme Province (Grand Duchy of Finland)
Olympic wrestlers of Finland
Wrestlers at the 1912 Summer Olympics
Finnish male sport wrestlers
19th-century Finnish people
20th-century Finnish people
World Wrestling Championships medalists